Neobatenus is a genus of ground beetles in the family Carabidae. There are about 17 described species in Neobatenus, found in Africa.

Species
These 17 species belong to the genus Neobatenus:

 Neobatenus deprimatus Basilewsky, 1988  (South Africa)
 Neobatenus elgonensis (Burgeon, 1935)  (Kenya and Uganda)
 Neobatenus fallaciosus (Péringuey, 1898)  (Mozambique, South Africa, and Zimbabwe)
 Neobatenus halophilus Basilewsky, 1962  (Tanzania)
 Neobatenus harroyi Basilewsky, 1956  (Burundi and Democratic Republic of the Congo)
 Neobatenus harveyi (Basilewsky, 1962)  (Tanzania)
 Neobatenus jimmae Basilewsky, 1975  (Ethiopia)
 Neobatenus kilimanus (Alluaud, 1917)  (Tanzania)
 Neobatenus laetulus (Péringuey, 1898)  (South Africa and Zimbabwe)
 Neobatenus malawiensis Basilewsky, 1988  (Malawi)
 Neobatenus pridhami (Basilewsky, 1962)  (Tanzania)
 Neobatenus pseudophanes (Alluaud, 1935)  (Madagascar)
 Neobatenus ruandanus (Burgeon, 1935)  (Democratic Republic of the Congo and Rwanda)
 Neobatenus striatitarsis (Péringuey, 1896)  (South Africa)
 Neobatenus transvaalensis (Péringuey, 1926)  (South Africa and Zimbabwe)
 Neobatenus witteanus (Burgeon, 1935)  (Democratic Republic of the Congo, Namibia, Rwanda, and Tanzania)
 Neobatenus zavattarii (Basilewsky, 1953)  (Ethiopia)

References

Platyninae